Norman Edward Mack (July 24, 1856 – December 26, 1932) was editor and publisher of the Buffalo Times. He was also Chairman of the Democratic National Committee from 1908 to 1912.

Biography
He was born July 24, 1856, in West Williams, Ontario, Canada. He was editor and publisher of the Buffalo Daily Times.

He was Chairman of the New York State Commission for the Panama–Pacific International Exposition in San Francisco in 1915.

He sold his paper in 1929 to Scripps-Howard for $6,000,000. He retired in 1931 and died on December 26, 1932, in Buffalo, New York.

References

|-

1856 births
1932 deaths
Businesspeople from Buffalo, New York
Democratic National Committee chairs
People from Middlesex County, Ontario